Iliamna Airport  is a state-owned public-use airport located three nautical miles (5.5 km) west of the central business district of Iliamna, in the Lake and Peninsula Borough of the U.S. state of Alaska.

Facilities 
Iliamna Airport has two asphalt paved runways: 7/25 is 5,087 by 100 feet (1,551 x 30 m) and 17/35 is 4,800 by 100 feet (1,463 x 30 m). It also has two seaplane landing areas: Runway E/W measures 2,998 x 400 ft. (914 x 122 m) and Runway N/S measures 2,892 x 400 ft. (881 x 122 m).

For the 12-month period ending December 31, 2004, the airport had 15,400 aircraft operations, an average of 42 per day: 73% general aviation and 27% air taxi. There are 18 aircraft based at this airport: 89% single engine and 11% multi-engine.

Airlines and destinations

References

External links 
 Alaska FAA airport diagram (GIF)
 

Airports in Lake and Peninsula Borough, Alaska